Caitlin Friend (born 10 November 1993) is an Australian football (soccer) striker who plays for Melbourne Victory.

Early life

Friend started playing football from the age of seven. At the age of 12, she was removed from her club after they banned girls from playing. After playing tennis for a year, she returned to local football club Brunswick Zebras.

Playing career

In January 2014, Friend agreed to join English FA WSL club Notts County after the Australian season had concluded, a season in which she had overtaken Jodie Taylor as Melbourne Victory's all-time top goalscorer.

After the WSL 2014 season, the Australian striker returned to Australia to play for Melbourne Victory after a year with Notts County. In January 2015 it was confirmed she would not be returning to Notts County for the 2015 season.

In October 2016, Friend returned to Melbourne Victory.

Post-playing career

Following Friend's retirement, she set up a training company called Elite Female Football, which works on training young female footballers. She was joined in this venture by Ashley Brown, Brianna Davey and Steph Catley.

References

1993 births
Living people
Melbourne Victory FC (A-League Women) players
Notts County L.F.C. players
Australian women's soccer players
A-League Women players
Soccer players from Melbourne
Women's association football midfielders
Australian expatriate sportspeople in England
Expatriate women's footballers in England
Australian expatriate women's soccer players
Sportswomen from Victoria (Australia)